Dammarenes are derivatives of dammaranes that have a double bond.

These compounds are often composed of saponins, examples include Protopanaxadiol and triol, Dammarenediol I and II.

See also
 Dammarenediol II synthase

References

Triterpenes